Tanya Callau (born February 20, 1976)  is a Bolivian-born actress and model.

Career 
In the 1990s, Callau came to United States from Bolivia to pursue modeling. Callau is best known for her 2004 role as Tanya, a Spanish Wedding Guest, in The Princess Diaries 2: Royal Engagement.<ref>{{Cite web|url=https://www.imdb.com/title/tt0368933/fullcredits |title= 'The Princess Diaries 2: Royal Engagement (2004). imdb.com |access-date=Dec 19, 2016}}</ref>
Starting in 2014, Callau starred with her husband, Alan Thicke, in Unusually Thicke, a Canadian reality show/sitcom hybrid. In 2014, Callau was the associate producer of 14 Unusually Thicke'' episodes.

Personal life 
In 1999, at age 23, Callau met Alan Thicke in Miami, where he was a celebrity host and she was a model. On May 7, 2005, Callau married Alan Thicke in Cabo San Lucas, Mexico. Callau was his third wife. She is the step-mother of Brennan Thicke, Carter Thicke and Robin Thicke.
On December 13, 2016, Callau became a widow when Alan Thicke died.

References

External links 

1976 births
Bolivian actresses
Living people